The Empire Builders is a 1924 American silent film starring Snowy Baker, the second movie the Australian actor made in America. It was highly popular in Australia.

Prominent roles were taken by the horses Boomerang and Prince Charlie.

Plot
The film is set in South Africa. Captain William Ballard of the Territorials is sent to make a treaty with the natives. He meets resistance from the Boers, still unreconciled to British rule. He falls in love with Katryn van der Poel. He succeeds in rescuing a lost party and recovering important military dispatches.

Cast
 Snowy Baker as Captain William Ballard
 Margaret Landis as Katryn van der Poel
 Theodore Lorch as Hendrik van der Poel
 Pinckney Harrison as Karui the king
 J.P. Lockney as a trader
 Jere Austin as Fritz van Roon

References

External links
 

1924 films
American black-and-white films